Papyrus Oxyrhynchus 72 (P. Oxy. 72) is a notice of a transfer of property (ἀπογραφή), written in Greek. The manuscript was written on papyrus in the form of a sheet. It was discovered by Grenfell and Hunt in 1897 in Oxyrhynchus. The document was written on 12 April 90. Currently it is housed in the Haskell Oriental Institute (2062) in University of Chicago. The text was published by Grenfell and Hunt in 1898.

The letter was addressed by Zoilus to the keepers of the archives. It reports on behalf of Marcus Porcius, who was away, the purchase of a piece of land. The measurements of the fragment are 408 by 96 mm.

See also 
 Oxyrhynchus Papyri
 Papyrus Oxyrhynchus 71
 Papyrus Oxyrhynchus 73

References 

072
1st-century manuscripts